The Killing Ground may refer to:
The Killing Ground (film), a 1979 documentary film written by Brit Hume
The Killing Ground (novel), a novel by Jack Higgins
Killing Ground (film), a 2016 horror thriller film directed and written by Damien Power
Killing Ground (novel), a novel by Steve Lyons based on the British television series Doctor Who
Killing Ground (album), an album by Saxon
"The Killing Ground", a song by Recoil on their album subHuman
 "The Killing Ground", a song by King Gizzard & the Lizard Wizard from their album Eyes Like the Sky